Music in the Key of Clark (subtitled Remembering Sonny Clark) is an album by pianist John Hicks which was recorded in 2001 and released on the HighNote label. The album features eight compositions by Sonny Clark and five by Hicks.

Reception
Allmusic reviewed the album stating "Overall, the desired effect of such a brilliant release is to make one want to obtain earlier CDs by John Hicks and also to look for the original versions by Sonny Clark, if they aren't already in the listener's possession". JazzTimes said "Music in the Key of Clark is not about imitation, however, but about tribute. Hicks calls attention to his predecessor's legacy with superb trio versions of pieces from Clark's huge output as a composer".

Track listing 
All compositions by Sonny Clark except as indicated
 "Pocket Full of Blues" (John Hicks) - 7:07
 "My Conception (Prelude)" - 1:23 	
 "My Conception" - 6:42
 "Cable Car" - 4:39
 "Sonny's Ballad" - 4:10 	
 "Minor Meeting" - 4:39
 "I Deal" - 4:11
 "Sonny's Mood" - 3:51
 "Sonny's Crib" - 5:17
 "Angel With a Briefcase" (Hicks) - 3:47
 "Clark Bar Blues" (Hicks) - 7:34
 "Sonny Side Up" (Hicks) - 5:29
 "A Sonny Day" (Hicks) - 4:27

Personnel 
John Hicks - piano
Dwayne Dolphin - bass
Cecil Brooks III - drums

Production
Cecil Brooks III - producer
David Baker - engineer

References 

John Hicks (jazz pianist) albums
2002 albums
HighNote Records albums
Tribute albums